(May 11, 1960 - ) is a Japanese tarento, narrator, disc jockey, actor, and columnist from Kobe, Hyōgo Prefecture. He is currently attached to Furutachi-Project. He is a graduate of the Osaka University of Arts's graphic design course, and is the chairman of the theatrical unit AGAPE store. He is also an associate professor in the Kyoto University of Art & Design.

Media

Film
Always Sanchōme no Yūhi (xxxx) (Real estate agent)
Gamera: Guardian of the Universe (xxxx) (Taxi driver)
Godzilla: Final Wars (xxxx) (Television debate panelist)
 Juvenile (2000)
Godzilla, Mothra and King Ghidorah: Giant Monsters All-Out Attack (2001) (Cameo appearance)
Nihon Igai Zenbu Chinbotsu (2006) (Forecaster)
Nihon Chinbotsu (2006) (Councillor)
It's a Flickering Life (2021)

Television
Baribari Value (xxxx) (Narrator)
Kinniku Banzuke (xxxx) (Narrator)
Tamori Club (xxxx) (MC)
Waratte Iitomo (1989-1990)
Asayan (1999-2001) (Narrator)
Naotora: The Lady Warlord (2017) (Iseya)

Commercials
Black Nikka Clear Brand
Shuto Expressway

Musicals
My Fair Lady (2013-2016) Alfred P. Doolittle

Television drama
Furuhata Ninzaburō (February 14, 1996 episode)

Television animation
South Park (Mister Mackey (Trey Parker))

Theatrical animation
Aladdin (The Peddler (Robin Williams))
Team America: World Police (DVD edition) (Kim Jong-il (Matt Stone))

References

External links
MATSUO TV

1960 births
Living people
People from Kobe
Osaka University of Arts alumni
21st-century Japanese male actors